Winifrida Mpembyemungu (born 1972) is a Rwandan politician, currently a member of the Chamber of Deputies in the Parliament of Rwanda.

Mpembyemungu is the former mayor of Musanze. In 2013 her house was attacked with explosives, resulting in a baby being killed and two others injured. In 2015 six people received lifetime jail sentences, for this and other FDLR-sponsored terrorist attacks.

In April 2016 assailants attacked her home at night, resulting in a man being shot and killed by security forces.

In June 2018 Mpembyemungu narrowly beat former MP Marie Therese Murekatete to gain the Rwanda Patriotic Front women's ticket for Musanze District.

References 

1972 births
Living people
Members of the Chamber of Deputies (Rwanda)
21st-century Rwandan women politicians
21st-century Rwandan politicians
Women mayors of places in Rwanda
Mayors of places in Rwanda
People from Musanze District
Rwandan Patriotic Front politicians